Camous (Gascon: Camors) is a former commune in the Hautes-Pyrénées department in south-western France. On 1 January 2019, it was merged into the new commune Beyrède-Jumet-Camous.

See also
Communes of the Hautes-Pyrénées department

References

Former communes of Hautes-Pyrénées